Chicago Renaissance may refer to:

 Chicago Black Renaissance, 1930–1940s creative movement from the Chicago Black Belt
 Chicago Renaissance, multiple periods of innovation in Chicago literature in the early 20th century